Agonopterix crassiventrella is a moth of the family Depressariidae. It is found in Croatia.

The wingspan is about 23.5 mm.

References

External links
lepiforum.de

Moths described in 1891
Agonopterix
Moths of Europe